Papowo Biskupie  (German: Bischöflich Papau) is a village in Chełmno County, Kuyavian-Pomeranian Voivodeship, in north-central Poland. It is the seat of the gmina (administrative district) called Gmina Papowo Biskupie. It is located in the Chełmno Land in the historic region of Pomerania.

Historic sights in the village include the Gothic St. Nicholas church and ruins of a Teutonic Order castle.

The village has a population of 720.

Papowo Biskupie is the birthplace of Polish singer, musical performer and actress Irena Santor (born 1934).

History
The village dates back to the Middle Ages, and was first mentioned in 1222. It was a royal village of the Polish Crown until 1505, when Polish King Alexander Jagiellon granted it to the Roman Catholic Diocese of Chełmno. Administratively it was located in the Polish Chełmno Voivodeship. It was annexed by Prussia in the First Partition of Poland in 1772, and from 1871 it was part of Germany, before it was reintegrated with Poland after the country regained independence following World War I in 1918.

During the German occupation of Poland (World War II), a forced labour subcamp of the Stalag XX-A prisoner-of-war camp was operated by the Germans in the village.

Sports
The local football club is Kasztelan Papowo Biskupie. It competes in the lower leagues.

Gallery

References

Villages in Chełmno County
Castles of the Teutonic Knights